Flacăra Stadium is a multi-use stadium in Năvodari. It currently is the home ground of CS Năvodari. It holds 5,000 people.

Football venues in Romania
Buildings and structures in Constanța County